The Passenger in Compartment Seven (German: Der Passagier von Nr. 7) is a 1922 German silent film directed by Willy Zeyn and starring Max Landa and Hanni Weisse.

Cast
 Max Landa
 Hanni Weisse
 Karl Platen
 Max Grünberg

References

Bibliography
 Grange, William. Cultural Chronicle of the Weimar Republic. Scarecrow Press, 2008.

External links

1922 films
Films of the Weimar Republic
Films directed by Willy Zeyn
German silent feature films
German black-and-white films